St Joseph's Almshouses  is a Grade II listed building at Brook Green, London W6 7BN.

They were built in 1851, probably by the architect William Wardell. Only four remain today.

References

External links
 

Grade II listed buildings in the London Borough of Hammersmith and Fulham
Grade II listed almshouses
Houses completed in 1851
Almshouses in London
1851 establishments in England